MV Tanimbar Bahari was an Indonesian coastal cargo ship that sank in a storm off Saumlaki in January 2022.

Description 
Tanimbar Bahari was a small, shallow-hulled ship used to transport cargo between the Indonesian islands. It had a gross tonnage of 551 GT and a summer deadweight of 570 DWT. It was powered by a single diesel engine and propelled by a single screw, which allowed for an average speed of 5.4 knots and a maximum speed of 7.7 knots.

History 
Tanimbar Bahari was built in 1984. On 5 January 2022, it was transporting cargo from Surabaya to Saumlaki. Just outside of Saumlaki harbor, the ship had to wait out a storm. Possibly due to strong waves and high winds, the ship developed a list and quickly sank. However, all of the crew were able to swim to the shore without sustaining any injuries.

References 

Cargo ships
Ships of Indonesia
1984 ships
Maritime incidents in 2022